Pierre Rainier Stefano Casiraghi  (born 5 September 1987) is the younger son and youngest of three children of Caroline, Princess of Hanover, and her second husband, Stefano Casiraghi. He is the maternal-line grandson of Rainier III, Prince of Monaco, and American actress Grace Kelly. Casiraghi is eighth in the line of succession to the Monegasque throne, following his twin cousins Hereditary Prince Jacques and Princess Gabriella, his mother, his brother Andrea, nephews Alexandre and Maximilian Casiraghi and niece India Casiraghi.

Early life and education
Casiraghi was born on 5 September 1987 at Princess Grace Hospital Centre, in La Colle, Monaco. He is named after his maternal great-grandfather, Prince Pierre, Duke of Valentinois, his maternal grandfather, Prince Rainier III, and his father. His godparents are his uncle, Prince Albert II, and his aunt by marriage Laura Sabatini Casiraghi, the wife of his uncle Daniele. Casiraghi was three years old at the time of his father's death in a boating accident. He spent his earliest years, after his father's death, living at his mother's farmhouse in the town of Saint-Rémy-de-Provence.

He attended a state school in Saint-Rémy-de-Provence. However, after his mother's remarriage to Ernst August, Prince of Hanover, the family moved to Fontainebleau, to be nearer to Paris and London, the latter being where his new stepbrothers lived with their mother. It is assumed that Casiraghi passed the French Baccalaureate exam in the summer of 2005 since he shortly afterwards began university. One year later, he moved to Milan to begin a three-year undergraduate course in international economics and management at Bocconi University. Besides French, he is fluent in Italian, English, and knows some German. He also plays the saxophone.

Humanitarian and business activities
From 30 January to 13 February 2007, Casiraghi accompanied his mother on a humanitarian tour of Africa. They visited Niger, Burundi, the Democratic Republic of Congo, and South Africa on behalf of Princess Caroline's role as President of AMADE Mondiale.

In June 2009, Casiraghi became the majority shareholder of the Monaco-based construction company Engeco, which his father founded in 1984. His uncle Marco remains in the position of President over Engeco. Casiraghi is also the majority shareholder of Monacair.

Casiraghi is on the Management Committee of the Yacht Club de Monaco. In this capacity, he sponsored the "Sail for a Cause" charity race, which was organized by his cousin Leticia de Massy, using her social network LeSpot.Net to promote it.  Sail for a Cause raises money for two charities: the Monaco Collectif Humanitaire and the Maison Notre Dame de Paix in Chad. The former funds surgeries for children around the world; the latter helps migrants.

In 2011, Casiraghi was inducted as an honorary member of the Jeune Chambre Economique de Monaco (JCEM).

Sailboat racing
Casiraghi is a participant in the sport of sailboat racing. In January 2014, he was part of the Masarati team in the Cape2Rio competition. His team completed the journey from Cape Town to Rio in a record 10 days, 11 hours. 29 minutes, and 57 seconds. Casiraghi was a crew member of the Monaco Racing Fleet captained by Tommaso Chieffi which was first to cross the finish line in the 2013 edition of the Palermo-Monte Carlo Regatta. Casiraghi and the Monaco Racing Fleet also won the 10th edition of the Palmero-Monte Carlo race in August 2014., Casiraghi's boat, the Esimit Europa 2, was the winner of the Giraglia Rolex Cup in June 2014.

Casiraghi is the skipper of Team Malizia, the crew which sails a hydrofoil sailboat (also called a foiling catamaran) in the annual GC32 Racing Tour. Team Malizia takes its name from Il Malizia, which means The Cunning, and which was the nickname assigned to Casiraghi's medieval ancestor François Grimaldi. Together with Boris Herrmann from Team Malizia he transported Greta Thunberg and her father Svante Thunberg across the Atlantic to enable her participation in the annual United Nations Framework Convention on Climate Change.

In August 2017, Casiraghi paired with Boris Herrmann to sail in the Fastnet Race. Starting at Cowes, moving up to Ireland and then back down to Devonshire, they finished the race in third place.

Auto racing
Casiraghi is a fixture in the Monte-Carlo Historic Rally, a vintage automobile race that occurs every year in January. In May 2014, he competed in a professional auto race for the first time at the Volkswagen Scirocco R-Cup in Hockenheim. He was a celebrity guest starter in the race, driving car #26, and finished 22nd in the first race and 20th in the second race. He said he was encouraged to enter the race by family friend and former racing driver Jacky Ickx.

Personal life 
Casiraghi has been in a relationship with the journalist Beatrice Borromeo since May 2008. They were married in a civil ceremony on 25 July 2015 in the gardens of the Prince's Palace of Monaco. The religious ceremony took place on Isolino di San Giovanni on 1 August 2015. Among the wedding guests were John Elkann, Lapo Elkann and Diane von Fürstenberg. Pierre and Beatrice's first child, Stefano Ercole Carlo, was born on 28 February 2017. Their second child, Francesco Carlo Albert, was born on 21 May 2018.

In February 2012, Casiraghi was briefly hospitalized following a physical altercation at a New York nightclub. According to media reports, Casiraghi approached the table of businessman Adam Hock, models Natasha Poly, Anja Rubik and Valentina Zelyaeva, where words were exchanged and an altercation ensued. Hock, who was later charged on eight counts of misdemeanor assault, alleges that Casiraghi was the aggressor and that he struck Casiraghi and his companions in self-defence. Casiraghi was treated at New York Presbyterian Hospital for a laceration, bruising, and swelling of his face.

References

1987 births
Living people
House of Grimaldi
Monegasque businesspeople
Kelly family
Monegasque people of Italian descent
Monegasque people of American descent
Monegasque Roman Catholics
Monegasque people of Irish descent
Monegasque people of Mexican descent
Monegasque people of Scottish descent
Monegasque people of English descent
Monegasque people of German descent
Audi Sport TT Cup drivers
Monegasque male sailors (sport)
Monegasque racing drivers